Praga E-39/BH-39 was a Czechoslovak trainer aircraft.

History 
This aircraft was designed by Pavel Beneš and Miroslav Hajn, engineers at the Czech aviation company ČKD-Praga in 1931. It flew for the first time in June of that year. The biplane, standard configuration for that era, was an immediate success and orders were placed by the Czechoslovak Air Force that used them as elementary training aircraft at its flight schools throughout the 1930s. Pre-World War II production of the machine was 139 units. In 1939 following the German occupation of Bohemia and Moravia, Slovakia became an independent country. It was a German ally and its small air force was placed under Luftwaffe control. Ten of the Praga E-39s were initially used as trainers by the Slovak Air Force. During the German invasion of the Soviet Union they were transferred to the Soviet front where they were employed by the Slovaks as reconnaissance platforms in support of German ground forces. Other E-39s were used by the Luftwaffe in their flight training schools as elementary trainers and still others were given to the Hungarian Air Force for use in that same role.

Variants
E-39NZ / BH-39NZPowered by an  Walter NZ 120, nine-cylinder air-cooled radial engine.
E-39G / BH-39GPowered by a  Walter Gemma, nine-cylinder air-cooled radial engine.

E-39AG / BH-39AGPowered by a  Armstrong Siddeley Genet Major, seven-cylinder air-cooled radial engine.

Operators

Czechoslovakian Air Force

Luftwaffe

Royal Hungarian Air Force

Slovak Air Force (1939-1945)
Slovak Insurgent Air Force

Specifications (BH-39NZ)

See also

E-39
1930s Czechoslovakian military trainer aircraft
Biplanes
Single-engined tractor aircraft
Aircraft first flown in 1931